David Dunstan is an Australian writer, journalist and historian.

He was born in New York of Australian parents and is the son of Australian journalist Keith Dunstan. He was educated at Monash, Melbourne and RMIT universities. He is currently senior research associate with the School of Philosophical, Historical and International Studies at Monash University.

Publications

His books include Governing the Metropolis: Melbourne 1850-1891 (1984), Better Than Pommard! A History of Wine in Victoria (1994), Victorian Icon: The Royal Exhibition Building, Melbourne (1996), Owen Suffolk’s Days of Crime and Years of Suffering (2001). His most recent book is A Vision for Wine: a History of the Viticultural Society of Victoria (2013). Together with Tom Heenan he wrote the chapter 'Don Bradman: Just a Boy From Bowral' for the Cambridge Companion to Cricket. He was a founding editor and contributor to the Encyclopedia of Melbourne.

Activities
David taught Public History and Australian Studies at Monash University from 1994 until 2014. He was Senior Historian with the Historic Buildings Council (now the Victorian Heritage Council) from 1984-1989 and subsequently Senior Exhibitions Developer with Museum Victoria. In 2010 he was the Menzies Fellow at the Menzies Centre for Australian Studies, King's College London. He lives in Melbourne. He worked as a freelance journalist, writing for newspapers and magazines such as The Age, Business Review Weekly, and The Sun-Herald, and extensively in scholarly journals. He has specialist research interests in the history of Melbourne, the social history of wine and viticulture, the history of newspapers, and international sport. His current research interests include the history of Melbourne, wine and viticulture, international exhibitions, sport, newspapers, and Australian national identity.

External links
Dr David Dunstan Dunstan's Monash University profile page
National Centre for Australian Studies Official NCAS website
Australian Dictionary of Biography
Encyclopedia of Melbourne
Owen Suffolk's days of crime and years of suffering
Royal Exhibition Building, Melbourne
Pyrenees Wine Region, Victoria

1950 births
Living people
Academic staff of Monash University